The Almaș is a left tributary of the river Someș in Romania. It discharges into the Someș in Var near Jibou. The name of the river means "apple + "s" as an adjective suffix" in the hungarians language.

Tributaries

The following rivers are tributaries to the river Almaș:

Left: Băbiu, Guiaga, Meștereaga, Benaia, Mierța, Sântă Măria, Jirnău
Right: Peștera, Dorogna, Jebuc, Valea Cetății, Petrind, Bozolnic, Sâncraiul Almașului, Dolu, Ugruțiu, Dragu, Printre Văi, Trestia

References

Rivers of Romania
Rivers of Sălaj County